The Onsong concentration camp was an internment camp in Changpyong, Onsong County, North Hamgyong, North Korea. It housed approximately 15,000 political prisoners. The camp was officially known as Concentration Camp (Kwan-li-so) No. 12.

Although information about the camp is scarce, two defectors have alleged the forcible suppression of a large riot in May 1987 at the camp. According to the testimony of Ahn Myong-chol, a guard at a similar camp, and Mun Hyon-il, a nearby resident, the riot started when one political prisoner at the camp killed a guard in protest of the guard's treatment of another prisoner; he was then joined by 200 others at the scene who overcame another guard. At the height of the riot, some 5,000 prisoners were openly in revolt.

Reinforced from a second camp, guards proceeded to open fire on the rioters with machine guns, the defectors have stated. Reports on the number of dead vary; the defectors claim all rioters were executed, while a third defector previously involved with the North Korean security services describes being told of the execution of only a third.

The camp was closed in 1989, a decision thought to be because of its proximity to the border with China. The prisoners were then transferred to Hoeryong concentration camp.

See also
Hoeryong concentration camp
Yodok concentration camp
Human rights in North Korea

References

External links
"Escapees from North Korean Hell", Le Monde, May 14, 2001.
"The testimony of An Myong Chol", Monthly Chosun, March, 1995.
"Pyongyang watch: The riot act?", Asia Times, November 3, 1999.

Onsong
North Hamgyong
Concentration camps in North Korea
Massacres in North Korea
1989 disestablishments in North Korea
Massacres committed by North Korea